Televisión Rioja is a Spanish television channel, launched in 1998. It was founded and started to broadcast on 1998. Televisión Rioja currently broadcasts in Spanish.

External links
www.tvr.es

Television stations in Spain
Television channels and stations established in 1998